Henry Mason may refer to:

Henry Mason (priest) (1573–1647), English priest and theological writer
Henry F. Mason (1860–1927), Kansas politician and judge
Henry Joseph Monck Mason (1778–1858), Irish writer
Henry Mason, alternative spelling used for state legislator and newspaperman Henry Mayson of Mississippi
Rex Mason (Henry Greathead Rex Mason, 1885–1975), New Zealand politician
Hank Mason (1931–2020), baseball player
Henry Mason (EastEnders), a fictional character

See also

Henry Mayson (born c. 1835), Mississippi politician
Harry Mason (disambiguation)
Hal Mason (disambiguation)